Arthur Vickers may refer to:

 Arthur Vickers (VC) (1882–1944), English soldier and a recipient of the Victoria Cross
 Arthur Vickers (artist) (born 1947), Canadian West Coast storyteller and artist

See also
 Sir Arthur Vicars (1862–1921), genealogist and heraldic expert